"Till the End" is a song co-written and recorded by American country music artist Vern Gosdin.  It was released in June 1977 as the third single and title track from his album of the same name.  Janie Fricke was the featured female vocalist on the track.  The song reached No. 7 on the Billboard Hot Country Singles chart in August 1977.  Gosdin wrote the song with his then-wife Cathy.

More than 30 years later, Alan Jackson recorded a cover version of "Till the End" for his 2010 album Freight Train. It is a duet recorded with Lee Ann Womack.

Charts

Weekly charts

Year-end charts

References

1977 singles
1977 songs
Vern Gosdin songs
Alan Jackson songs
Lee Ann Womack songs
Songs written by Vern Gosdin
Elektra Records singles